Donato Francisco Ndongo-Bidyogo Makina (born 12 December 1950), known as Donato Ndongo, is an Equatoguinean journalist and writer who was one of the most prominent members of Hispanic African movement within the Spanish-speaking world.

Early life
Ndongo was born in Niefang in 1950 (then in the Spanish Guinea, now in Equatorial Guinea).

Writings
Some of Ndongo's best-known books include Historia y tragedia de Guinea Ecuatorial (1977) and El Comercio Español con Africa (1980), in addition to numerous novels, historical, cultural and political articles written in Spain and for the foreign press. In 1984 he coordinated an anthology of Equatorial Guinean literature and was a finalist for the Sésamo Prize for his work entitled Las Tinieblas de tu Memoria Negra.

Professional activities
Subsequently, Ndongo has served as the adjunct director for "Nuestra Señora de África de Madrid" (Our Lady of Africa in Madrid) and the "Centro Cultural Hispano-Guineano de Malabo" (The Center for Hispanic-Guinean Culture in Malabo).

Ndongo has been a visiting professor at several American universities, including the University of Missouri-Columbia from 2005-2008.

English Publications
Shadows of Your Black Memory, translated and with a postscript by Michael Ugarte, Swan Isle Press (2007)

References

External links
 Ndongo has temporary home at the University of Missouri

1950 births
Living people
People from Centro Sur
Equatoguinean journalists
Equatoguinean male writers
Male journalists
Equatoguinean novelists
Equatoguinean Spanish-language writers
Male novelists
20th-century novelists
Equatoguinean emigrants to Spain
20th-century male writers